The Rutland Weekend Songbook, sometimes referred to as Rutland Times, is a 1976 album by Eric Idle and Neil Innes featuring songs from the BBC comedy series Rutland Weekend Television.

It was described by Allmusic's reviewer as "a 21-track masterpiece that really is as funny as it ought to be. An effortless parody of the last decade or so of British television's most treasured conceits".

Track listing

Side one
 "L'Amour Perdu" - 0:38
 "Gibberish" - 1:38
 "Front Loader" - 2:39
 "Say Sorry Again" - 2:19
 "I Must Be in Love" - 2:36
 "Twenty-Four Hours in Tunbridge Wells" - 1:48
 "The Fabulous Bingo Brothers" - 1:09
 "Concrete Jungle Boy" - 3:21
 "The Children of Rock and Roll" - 0:44
 "Stoop Solo" - 2:36
 "The Song O' the Insurance Men" - 0:55

Side two
 "Testing" - 0:37
 "I Give Myself to You" - 2:19
 "Communist Cooking" - 1:24
 "Johnny Cash" - 0:57
 "Protest Song" - 3:42
 "Accountancy Shanty" - 0:45
 "Football" - 1:33
 "Boring" - 2:39
 "L'Amour Perdu Cha Cha Cha" - 1:54
 "The Hard to Get" - 3:03
 "The Song O' the Continuity Announcers" - 2:14

 Early version of The Rutles' "I Must Be in Love"
 Early version of The Rutles' "Good Times Roll"

(BBC REB233). (CD issue MSI MSI 10079 Japan only)

Personnel
Eric Idle - vocals
 Neil Innes (credited as "Nobby") - piano
 Roger Rettig - guitar
 Billy Bremner - guitar
 Brian Hodgson - bass
 John Halsey - drums
 Andy Roberts - guitar
 Dave Richards - bass
 Roger Swallow - drums

References

External links 

1976 albums
BBC Records albums
Eric Idle albums
Neil Innes albums
Albums produced by Neil Innes